XHPRGZ-FM is a radio station on 92.7 FM in Río Grande, Zacatecas. It is known as La Bonita del Norte.

History
XHPRGZ was awarded in the IFT-4 radio auction of 2017. The station signed on in the summer of 2018.

References

Radio stations in Zacatecas
Radio stations established in 2018
2018 establishments in Mexico